Rajiv Kumar Biswas also known as Rajib Biswas or Rajiv Kumar is an Indian film director who works in Bengali films.

Filmography

Director

References

Living people
Bengali film directors
21st-century Indian film directors
Year of birth missing (living people)
Film directors from Kolkata